The Muskeg Lake Cree Nation is a Cree First Nation band government in Marcelin, Saskatchewan, Canada.

The Muskeg Lake Cree Nation is affiliated with the Saskatoon Tribal Council, along with six other First Nations.

Noted people from this reserve include World War II servicewoman Mary Greyeyes, the first indigenous woman to join the Canadian Forces.

Reserves

Muskeg Lake Cree Nation has reserved for itself 15 reserves:

 Asimakaniseekan Askiy 102A
 Asimakaniseekan Askiy 102B
 Lake Pitihkwakew 102B
 Muskeg Lake 102
 Muskeg Lake 102B
 Muskeg Lake 102C
 Muskeg Lake 102D
 Muskeg Lake 102E
 Muskeg Lake 102F
 Muskeg Lake 102G
 Muskeg Lake 102H
 Muskeg Lake 102J
 Muskeg Lake 102K
 Muskeg Lake 102L
 Muskeg Lake 102M

References

External links

Cree governments
First Nations governments in Saskatchewan